Isabella Toscano is a fictional character from the NBC soap opera Days of Our Lives. The character first appeared on a recurring basis on October 16, 1989, and was portrayed by actress Staci Greason. Greason was put on contract in December 1989. Greason left the show in October 1992, after Isabella died from pancreatic cancer. Greason reappeared later on as Isabella's ghost in 1995, 2000, 2002, 2003, and most recently in November 2010.

Storylines
Isabella was born on July 27, 1960, to Loretta Toscano and Ernesto Toscano. She had an older sister, Marina Theresa Toscano. In 1989, Isabella was introduced as an inmate at an asylum. Isabella's sister, Marina (Hunter Tylo) was keeping her locked up against her will. She escaped with the help of Jack Deveraux and she hid in his loft. Together, Jack and Isabella discovered the Toscano family treasure and her mother, Loretta's diary—which Marina had been looking for.

When Marina's dead body was discovered, Steve's wife, Kayla Brady was convicted in her murder. Unwilling to believe Kayla was guilty, Isabella teamed up with Kayla's brother, Roman Brady. In a surprising turn of events, Isabella and Roman discovered Isabella killed Marina, then blocked the deed from her memory. With this new evidence, Kayla was released and Isabella cleared on the grounds of self-defense.

In the summer of 1990, Isabella became a key figure in the infamous Cruise of Deception storyline when Ernesto Toscano, also seeking his late wife Loretta's diary, invited Salem's most prominent members aboard his yacht.  Jack returned some of the diary's pages he had stole. Isabella discovered her biological father was not Ernesto but Victor Kiriakis. A furious Ernesto then kidnapped Isabella, taking her to a nearby island. Just before Ernesto succeeded in poisoning Isabella as he had her mother after he discovered Loretta's affair with Victor, Roman rescued Isabella. In the mayhem, Ernesto and Hope Brady were killed.

Returning to Salem, Isabella began a private investigation agency with her new-found brother, Bo Brady, and her relationship with Roman deepened. The couple become engaged and made plans to move in together when Roman's presumed-dead wife, Marlena, returned to Salem. A devastated Isabella assured Roman she would not stand in the way of rebuilding his marriage with Marlena. However, she began to truly despair when she discovered she was pregnant with Roman's baby.

Things came to a head when Roman and Marlena were confronted by a man claiming to be the "real" Roman Brady.  Roman's mother, Caroline Brady, confirmed the latter's claim. Salemites were stunned to learn the man that they called Roman for six years was an impostor. Devastated, the false Roman reverted to using his old name, John Black, and began a desperate search into his real identity. He also reunited with Isabella after she told him she was having their child.  On May 19, 1992, during the couple's marriage ceremony, Isabella went into labor; she quickly gave birth to Brady Victor Black and named him in honor of the Brady family and Isabella's father.

The Black family's happiness was short-lived when Dr. Carly Manning informed Isabella her back pain was the result of advanced pancreatic cancer. Telling John she wanted to die in her "real" home, John and Isabella went to Venice where she quietly died in John's arms on October 16, 1992.

Isabella's afterlife
In 1993, Marlena and Roman Brady named their newborn daughter Isabella, nicknamed Belle for short. In a not-unusual daytime plot twist, Marlena discovered that John was the father of Belle, not Roman. Isabella's ghost made several guest appearances: in 1995, as part of Satan's plot, and in 2000, while attempting to save Eric Brady. Later that year, Isabella appeared to John as her former husband prayed for guidance, unsure as how he could best help their angry, now college-age son, Brady.  In 2002 and 2003, a ghostly Isabella again appeared to a now calmer Brady, who was struggling with his feelings for Chloe Lane. She also appeared to Brady on several occasions in 2010 while Brady had Vivian Alamain buried alive inside a sarcophagus.

On Mother's Day in 2019, her son Brady and Kristen DiMera welcomed their daughter Rachel Isabella DiMera Black, who was named after her and Kristen's mother: Rachel Blake, who was switched at birth by Xander Kiriakis, under orders by her great- grandfather Victor to spare his wife Maggie Horton the truth that she's responsible for the deaths of Adrienne Johnson and her granddaughter: the real Mackenzie Horton. Rachel later had developed cancer and needed a bone marrow transplant from Gabi Hernandez.

In order to remember their daughter, a technique taught to Brady by his step-mother Marlena Evans, Kristen remembers that Rachel has a heart shaped birthmark on her neck.

Later, Brady's ex-girlfriend Nicole Walker discovered the truth about the baby switch by overhearing the conversation between Dr. Amanda Raynor and Xander, later between Xander and Victor, then sets up a fight between herself and Kristen to get a DNA sample, which is tampered by Xander by paying the lab technician, because Nicole is on to him. Later, after her talk with Abe Carver, Nicole is planning to find Dr. Raynor to get the truth about the baby switch between Rachel and Mackenzie in order to tell Eric Brady and Sarah the truth about their baby and to reunite Rachel with her parents. While in the hospital with Rachel, Brady noticed that the baby has a heart-shaped birthmark on her neck and confide with his father John about his suspicions about Rachel and Mackenzie. Later, Nicole got confirmation from Raynor, she is prepare to tell Eric the truth about Rachel and Mackenzie. After finding out his daughter is alive, Brady realizes that his grandfather Victor and his cousin Xander were behind the baby switch that cause Sarah Horton to kidnap Rachel and flee to her cousin Abigail and Chad's apartment in Paris. After learning that Kristen stabbed Victor, Brady took the blame in order to protect her and went to jail. Kristen later tells Lani the truth about Victor's stabbing. Later, Kristen receive a phone call from Rex Brady (Kyle Lowder) and with the help of her nephew and Lani's brother Theo Carver (Kyler Pettis), she learns that Rachel and Sarah are in Paris by tracking Rex's phone. After Kristen finds Sarah and Rachel at the train station, she confronts Sarah over taking Rachel, then after her heartbreaking plea, she convinces Sarah to give her baby back, she is then reunited with Rachel after Sarah hands her over. Kristen and Rachel is later reunited with Brady, but Kristen tells Brady that she can't go back to Salem, because of her warrant for stabbing Victor. Then, Brady tells her to take Rachel and go on the run, she leaves the train station with Rachel after a heartfelt goodbye with Brady. After Brady returns to Salem without Kristen and Rachel, he tells Eric and Nicole that he let Kristen and Rachel go on a run, and Eric gets angry over the situation, But Nicole understands the situation. Then, Brady meets Sarah at the Salem Pub after she learns that Kristen is on the run with Rachel and they have decided to plotted to get revenge on Victor and Xander for that they did to them and their children.

References

External links
Isabella at soapcentral.com

Days of Our Lives characters
Fictional Greek people in television
Television characters introduced in 1989
Female characters in television
Kiriakis family